At the Dawn of a New Millennium is the first compilation album by the Canadian progressive rock band Mystery.  Released in 2000, it contains music from Mystery's first three studio releases, featuring Gary Savoie as lead vocalist on all tracks. At the Dawn of a New Millennium was remastered and reissued in 2013.

Track listing

Release information
 CD - Unicorn Records - UNCR-2040 - 2000
 CD - Unicorn Digital - UNCR-5085 - 2013

References

2000 compilation albums
Mystery (band) compilation albums